Armaguedon is a French-Italian crime-thriller film starring Alain Delon, and adapted from the novel The Voice of Armageddon by David Lippincott.

It recorded admissions of 716,098 in France.

Cast
 Alain Delon as Dr. Michel Ambroise
 Jean Yanne  as Louis Carrier
 Renato Salvatori as  Albert, aka "Einstein"
 Michel Duchaussoy  as Inspector Jacques Vivien
 Marie Déa  as  Gisèle Valin
 Michel Creton  as  Bob
 Susanna Javicoli as  Gabriella
 Guy Saint-Jean as  Dupré
 Luigi Lavagnetto as  Sampieri
 Jeanne Herviale as  La voisine d'en face
 Gabriel Cattand  as  Jimmy Laurent 
 Robert Dalban  as  Taxi Driver 
 Michèle Cotta  as  Journalist

References

External links

1977 films
Films produced by Alain Delon
French crime thriller films
1970s crime thriller films
1970s French-language films
1970s French films